John Thomas O'Brien (born December 11, 1930) is a former backup second baseman and pitcher in Major League Baseball who played for the Pittsburgh Pirates (1953, 1955–58), St. Louis Cardinals (1958) and Milwaukee Braves (1959). O'Brien batted and threw right-handed. His twin brother, Eddie, was also a major league infielder.

O'Brien attended Saint Mary's High School in South Amboy, now Cardinal McCarrick High School, where he has been inducted into the school's sports hall of fame.

O'Brien attended Seattle University, where he played on the basketball team for the Chieftains (along with his brother Eddie) and scored 43 points in a stunning 84–81 upset over the Harlem Globetrotters on January 21, 1952. In 1953, O'Brien became the first player in NCAA history to score 1,000 points in a season. O'Brien would be the shortest NCAA All-American player to be named until 2016 when the similarly  Tyler Ulis of Kentucky was named a member of the first team. Later he and Eddie were drafted by the NBA's Milwaukee Hawks in 1953, but the twins never played in the NBA.
 
In a six-season career, O'Brien was a .250 hitter (204-for-815) with four home runs and 59 RBI in 339 games played. From 1956 to 1958, he also doubled as a pitcher, appearing in 25 games (all but one in relief) and 61 innings, surrendering 61 hits, walking 30 and striking out 35. He lost three of four decisions (.250) with an earned run average of 5.61.

While in Pittsburgh, Johnny and Eddie O'Brien became the first twins in major league history to play for the same team in the same game. They are also one of only four brother combinations to play second base/shortstop on the same major league club. The others are Garvin and Granny Hamner, for the Philadelphia Phillies in 1945; Frank and Milt Bolling, with the Detroit Tigers in 1958, and Billy and Cal Ripken, for the Baltimore Orioles during the 1980s.

In retirement, O'Brien worked variously as a city councilman in Seattle, a sportscaster of Seattle University basketball games along with Keith Jackson, the head of security, sales and promotions at the Kingdome and an energy consultant for the Alaskan shipping industry.

References

External links

Johnny O'Brien - Baseballbiography.com
Retrosheet

1930 births
Living people
All-American college men's basketball players
American men's basketball players
Baseball players from New Jersey
Basketball players from New Jersey
Houston Astros scouts
Major League Baseball second basemen
Milwaukee Braves players
Milwaukee Hawks draft picks
People from South Amboy, New Jersey
Pittsburgh Pirates players
Seattle Rainiers players
Seattle Redhawks baseball players
Seattle Redhawks men's basketball players
Sportspeople from Middlesex County, New Jersey
St. Louis Cardinals players